Anil Kumar (born 27 October 1971) is an Indian wrestler. He competed in the men's freestyle 52 kg at the 1992 Summer Olympics.

References

External links
 

1971 births
Living people
Indian male sport wrestlers
Olympic wrestlers of India
Wrestlers at the 1992 Summer Olympics
Place of birth missing (living people)